Rovensky (masculine), Rovenskaya (feminine), or Rovenskoye (neuter) is the name of several rural localities in Russia:
Rovensky, Kemerovo Oblast, a settlement in Arsentyevskaya Rural Territory of Kemerovsky District of Kemerovo Oblast
Rovensky, Novosibirsk Oblast, a settlement in Kargatsky District of Novosibirsk Oblast
Rovensky, Oryol Oblast, a settlement in Berezovsky Selsoviet of Dmitrovsky District of Oryol Oblast